This is a discography for the band The Pillows.

Discography

Studio albums

Extended plays

Compilations

Singles

Promotional singles

Soundtracks
 Love & Pop (various artists, 1998)
 FLCL No. 1: Addict (with Shinkichi Mitsumune) (2004)
 FLCL No. 2: King of Pirates (2004)
 Colors of Life (various artists, 2004)
 Moonlight Jellyfish (various artists, 2004)
 FLCL No. 3 (2005)
 FooL on CooL generation (2018)
 Ousama Ni Nare (2019)

Compilations (with or by other artists)
 Respectable Roosters (1999)
 Life Is Delicious (2001)
 Beat Offenders (2002)
 Synchronized Rockers (tribute album,  2004)
 802 Heavy Rotations J-Hits Complete '94-'96 (2004)
 Wasurerarenai Koi no Uta (2005)
 The Collectors - 20th Anniversary Special Album (2006)
 Electric Rays (2008)
 Lightning Runaway (2009)
 ROCK AND SYMPATHY (tribute album,  2014)
 Yes, We Love Butchers: Mumps (2014)

Videography

Video albums

References

Discographies of Japanese artists
Rock music group discographies